Stadttheater Minden is a municipal theatre in Minden, North Rhine-Westphalia, Germany. The theatre has no ensemble, but stages some productions of its own. It became known for a Wagner project culminating in Der Ring in Minden.

History 
It seats 568 people. The theatre was opened on 1 October 1908 with a performance of Goethe's play Iphigenie auf Tauris.

The theatre has no ensemble, but stages some productions of its own. It is also used by guest ensembles and touring theatre groups, and serves as a concert hall for symphony concert series of the Nordwestdeutsche Philharmonie, and for other events.

In September 1998, to mark the 1200th anniversary of the town, the chamber opera Friedrich und Katte by Wolfgang Knuth (born 1959) was composed and premiered at the theatre.

In 1999, a project to show operas by Richard Wagner was begun by the Richard-Wagner-Verband Minden, the theatre and the Nordwestdeutsche Philharmonie. The first work presented was in 2002 Der fliegende Holländer, followed by Tannhäuser in 2005, staged by Keith Warner and conducted by Frank Beermann. Lohengrin was performed in 2009. The project of 2012 was Tristan und Isolde, staged by Matthias von Stegmann; Beermann conducted, with the title roles performed by Andreas Schager and Dara Hobbs. A production of Der Ring des Nibelungen opened in 2015 with Das Rheingold, followed a year later by Die Walküre. The Wagner project has received international recognition.

In 2014 the theatre began a professional project for young people (Jugendtheaterprojekt) with Romeo und Julia – Out With Love based on Shakespeare's Romeo and Juliet in the Shakespeare-year 2014. In a joint venture with the school Kurt-Tucholsky-Gesamtschule, the intendant Andrea Krauledat and the theatre pedagogue Viola Schneider staged the production, performed in the theatre hall. The following season, the project was continued by Schiller's Die Räuber in collaboration with the Ratsgymnasium Minden, again directed by Krauledat and Schneider, and Moritz Rinke's Die Nibelungen, in collaboration with the youth club t3.

Wagner project 
Beginning in 2002, stage works by Wagner were produced at the theatre, initiated by Jutta Hering-Winckler, president of the local Richard Wagner Society. The orchestra was the Nordwestdeutsche Philharmonie, conducted by Frank Beermann. The performances were reviewed internationally. Reviews by Eleonore Büning in the Frankfurter Allgemeine Zeitung (FAZ) compared the productions favourably with those of the Bayreuth Festival and noted that singers make their way to Bayreuth from Minden.

Der Ring in Minden 

From 2015, the same team staged a yearly production of the four parts of Der Ring des Nibelungen, presenting the complete cycle twice in 2019.

References

External links 

 
 Die Nibelungen / von Moritz Rinke (program book) Stadttheater Minden 

Theatres in North Rhine-Westphalia
1900s architecture